Adolf Winkelmann (born 10 April 1946 in Hallenberg) is a German film director, film producer and screenwriter. He is also a professor of film design (concept and design) in the department of design at the Dortmund University of Applied Sciences and Arts.

Filmography
Films directed by Adolf Winkelmann:
 1967: Kassel 9.12.1967 11H54 (short)
 1967: 31 Sprünge (short)
 1967: Es spricht Ruth Schmidt (short)
 1969: Heinrich Viel (documentary)
 1978: On the Move (Die Abfahrer)
 1981:  (Jede Menge Kohle)
 1984: Super
 1987: 
 1989: Der Leibwächter (TV film)
 1992: 
 1994: Dangerous Games (TV film, based on a novel by Julian Rathbone)
 1996: The Last Courier (TV film)
 1999: Waschen, schneiden, legen
 2004:  (TV film)
 2007:  (TV film)
 2007:  (TV film)
 2010: Fliegende Bilder for the Dortmund U-Tower
 2016:  (based on a novel by Ralf Rothmann)

References

External links
 
  Adolf Winkelmann website

1946 births
Mass media people from North Rhine-Westphalia
People from Hochsauerlandkreis
Living people
Best Director German Film Award winners